Abdulaziz Al-Alawi (born 25 May 1998), is a Saudi Arabian professional footballer who plays as a left back for Al-Adalah.

Career
Al-Alawi started his career at the youth team of Al-Ahli and represented the club at every level except the senior level. On 24 August 2018, Al-Alawi joined Abha on a one-year contract following his release from Al-Ahli. On 14 January 2019, he was released after making 2 appearances in all competitions. On 30 January 2019, Al-Alawi joined Al-Orobah on a six-month contract. Following Al-Orobah's relegation, Al-Alawi joined Ohod on a one-year contract. On 17 July 2020, Al-Alawi joined Al-Nassr on a free transfer. He signed a three-year contract with the club. On 7 August 2021, Al-Alawi joined Al-Batin on loan. On 17 January 2023, Al-Alawi joined Al-Adalah on a free transfer.

Career statistics

Club

Notes

References

External links
 

1998 births
Living people
Saudi Arabian footballers
Association football fullbacks
Al-Ahli Saudi FC players
Abha Club players
Al-Orobah FC players
Ohod Club players
Al Nassr FC players
Al Batin FC players
Al-Adalah FC players
Saudi First Division League players
Saudi Professional League players